The 1903–04 Syracuse Orangemen men's basketball team represented Syracuse University during the 1903–04 college men's basketball season. The head coach was John A. R. Scott, coaching his first season with the Orangemen.

Schedule

|-

Source

Roster
Clarence Houseknecht
Arthur Brady
George Kirchgasser
Earl Twombley
Art Powell
Earle Niles
Charles Kinne
George McAdam
Corneilus Van Duyn
Earl Rice
Edwin Millen
H. D. Scott
Clinton Goodwin
Frank Cosedine

References

External links
 OrangeHoops.com recap of 1903–04 season

Syracuse
Syracuse Orange men's basketball seasons
Syracuse Orange Basketball Team
Syracuse Orange Basketball Team